Oh Joo-ho (born 2 April 1992) is a South Korean footballer who plays for Shillong Lajong in the I-League from last two season.

Career

Oh Juho from the Republic of Korea has played in Korean leagues since 2008. He also played for National Police Commissary FC of Cambodian League and UiTM of Liga Premier.

References

1992 births
Living people
South Korean footballers
South Korean expatriate footballers
Goyang Zaicro FC players
K League 2 players
Expatriate footballers in Cambodia
South Korean expatriate sportspeople in Cambodia
Association football defenders